Garankin is a rural locality (a khutor) in Kalach, Kalacheyevsky District, Voronezh Oblast, Russia. The population was 52 as of 2010. There are 2 streets.

Geography 
Garankin is located 11 km northwest of Kalach (the district's administrative centre) by road. Grinyov is the nearest rural locality.

References 

Rural localities in Kalacheyevsky District